Zom is a traditional Yemenite Jewish soup that is most commonly served as part of the Yom Kippur break fast among those in the Yemenite Jewish community, mostly in Israel.

Overview

Zom is typically made by mixing together various Israeli soft cheeses such as the 5% and 9% fat varieties, which are similar to quark or strained yogurt, along with water, a thickener such as flour, and salt. Other Jewish communities such as the Bulgarian Jews eat a similar soup. Zom is traditionally consumed after the observance of Yom Kippur as part of the breaking of the fast, and is accompanied by samneh (a smoked, fermented clarified butter), schug (a Yemenite Jewish green chili hot sauce), and bread such as challah or kubaneh which is used for dipping.

References

See also

Kubaneh
Fatoot samneh
Challah

Jewish cuisine
Soups
Yom Kippur
Israeli cuisine
Yogurt-based dishes
Mizrahi Jewish cuisine